The Means–Justiss House on 6th St., SE, in Paris, Texas is a one-and-a-half-story house that was built in c.1923:  by 1926 it replaced a two-story house that was on its location in 1920.  It was listed on the National Register of Historic Places in 1988.

It is a "fine" Craftsman bungalow apparently built by Oscar and Mary Means.  It was later occupied by Thomas Justiss, supervisor of Paris schools.

See also

National Register of Historic Places listings in Lamar County, Texas

References

Houses on the National Register of Historic Places in Texas
Houses completed in 1923
Houses in Lamar County, Texas
American Craftsman architecture in Texas
Paris, Texas
National Register of Historic Places in Lamar County, Texas
Bungalow architecture in Texas